Green Village is an unincorporated community located within portions of both Harding Township and Chatham Township in Morris County, New Jersey, United States. It is located just north of the Great Swamp National Wildlife Refuge. It is named after Ashbel Green, former president of Princeton University.

Green Village has its own post office and fire department, as well as a plant nursery known as the Farm, a deli, a Methodist church, and a gas station. Green Village principally consists of three streets, namely Green Village Road, Meyersville Road and Britten Road. Subject to an ongoing surveying controversy it may include a portion of Woodland Road.

In the Forbes magazine 2006 ranking of the Most Expensive ZIP Codes in the United States, Green Village was ranked as the 282nd most expensive in the country, with its median home sale price in 2005 of $777,465.

Demographics

Education
Students attend schools in either Harding Township or Chatham, depending on which side of Green Village they live in.

Green Village Fire Department
Prior to 1922, the Madison Fire Company responded to fire alarms in the Green Village area. In March 1922 a formal meeting was held in the school house, now the Green Village Deli. Chief Philhower of the Madison Fire Company explained the requirements and responsibilities of a volunteer fire company and gave advice on how to organize one. Papers of incorporation were drawn up and signed by the men present at the meeting, thus becoming charter members of the company. The certificate of incorporation was issued on April 17, 1922.

On November 22, 1922, a group of women met at the school house an organized the Green Village Ladies Auxiliary, their mission being to "aid and benefit the firemen and foster a spirit of friendliness among the community". The first social affair was a dance held at Holly Hill Farm in December 1922. While the fire house was being built, the Auxiliary raised money though suppers, teas and card parties.

One of the fire company's first requirements was that each member purchase a fire bucket to be kept ready for emergencies at all times. The buckets had rounded bottoms so that they could not be set down and instead had to be hung; it was thought that buckets with flat bottoms would be used for a variety of purposes and would not be available when and alarm sounded. The buckets were actually used at several fires by forming two lines of firemen between the waters source and the fire. One line of men passed buckets of water to the fire while the other passed back the empty buckets for more water.

The fire company's first piece of equipment was a four-wheeled wagon carrying a chemical tank, purchased from the Newark Fire Department. The wagon was taken to fires by hitching it to the back of an automobile. The first piece of motorized equipment was a Reo truck, which carried four copper chemical tanks. Purchased in 1923, it was used for more than 15 years.

Work on the firehouse was begun a few weeks after the organization of the fire company. The land was donated by Mr. William DeMott, who owned a saw mill and basket factory in Green Village. Trees were donated by the residents, which members of the fire company then cut into logs. The logs were hauled by teams of horses driven by Jacob Hinds, Elijah Hinds, Dudley Jackson and George Sutter to Daniel Pierson's saw mill on Southern Boulevard where they were sawed into lumber free of charge. The original firehouse, with the exception of the roof, was built by members of the Green Village Fire Company who donated their time and skills.

An addition to the firehouse, consisting of two extra bays for fire trucks, was dedicated in 1954. Further expansion occurred in the mid-1980s, again enlarging the bay area, forming a command office and creating a banquet room that is available for public use. All of the architectural designs were done by Walter Pfeiffer, who also donated the beautiful chandeliers. In 1990, Robert Swenor renovated the kitchen and foyer.

References

Chatham Township, New Jersey
Harding Township, New Jersey
Unincorporated communities in Morris County, New Jersey
Unincorporated communities in New Jersey